Matthieu Jalibert (born 6 November 1998) is a French rugby union player. His position is fly-half and he currently plays for Bordeaux Bègles in the Top 14.

International career
Jalibert previously represented France in the U20 Rugby World Cup.

Jalibert was called up to the French national team for the first time ahead of France's opening 2018 Six Nations Championship match against Ireland, aged only 19. He started in that game but had to come off in the 29th minute for Anthony Belleau due to a serious knee injury, which required a head injury assessment, in an eventual 13–15 home loss.

International tries

References

External links
France profile at FFR
UBB profile
L'Équipe profile

1998 births
Living people
Sportspeople from Saint-Germain-en-Laye
French rugby union players
Union Bordeaux Bègles players
Rugby union fly-halves
France international rugby union players